Indoartemon is a genus of air-breathing land snails, terrestrial pulmonate gastropod mollusks in the family Streptaxidae.

Distribution 
The distribution of the genus Indoartemon includes:
 Sri Lanka
 South-East Asia
 Hainan, China

Species
 within the genus Indoartemon include:
 Indoartemon cingalensis (Benson, 1853)
 Indoartemon deformis D. S. Do & T. S. Nguyen, 2020
 Indoartemon diodonta Inkhavilay & Panha, 2016
 Indoartemon eburneus (L. Pfeiffer, 1861)
 Indoartemon fuchsianus (Gredler, 1881)
 Indoartemon gracilis (Collet, 1898)
 Indoartemon huberi (Thach, 2016)
 Indoartemon laevis (W. T. Blanford, 1899)
 Indoartemon layardianus (Benson, 1853)
 Indoartemon medius Siriboon & Panha, 2014
 Indoartemon parallelilabris D. S. Do & T. S. Nguyen, 2020
 Indoartemon prestoni (Gude, 1903)
 Indoartemon tridens (Möllendorff, 1898)
 Indoartemon vietnamensis Thach & F. Huber, 2020
Species brought into synonymy
 Indoartemon eburnea (L. Pfeiffer, 1861): synonym of Indoartemon eburneus (L. Pfeiffer, 1861)

References

 Forcart, L. (1946). Indoartemon subgen. nov. for Odontartemon Kobelt, 1905 (non Pfeiffer, 1856); Streptaxidae. Journal of Conchology. 22 (9): 215
 Bank, R. A. (2017). Classification of the Recent terrestrial Gastropoda of the World. Last update: July 16, 2017

Streptaxidae